Edward, My Son is a British play written by Noel Langley and Robert Morley. Its original West End run lasted for 782 performance between 30 May 1947 and 23 April 1949, initially at His Majesty's Theatre and then at the Lyric Theatre. The play portrays the moral decline of a business tycoon, Sir Arnold Holt, who has worked his way up from humble beginnings. Holt's efforts for social advancement are driven by his desire to provide the best for his only son, Edward of the title, who never actually appears. 

The original cast included Morley himself as Arnold Holt alongside Peggy Ashcroft, Leueen MacGrath and Richard Caldicot. John Clements later took over the lead role from Morley. In 1948 it transferred to Broadway, lasting for 260 performances at the Martin Beck Theatre.

Original cast
Arnold Holt - Robert Morley
Evelyn Holt - Peggy Ashcroft
Dr. "Larry" Parker - John Robinson
Harry Soames - Richard Caldicot
Dr. Waxman - James Cairncross
Cunningham - Waldo Sturrey
Ellerby - Norman Pitt
Hanray - D.A. Clarke-Smith
Eileen Perry - Leueen MacGrath
Mr. Prothero - John Allen
Montague Burton - James Cairncross
Summers - Waldo Sturrey
Phyllis Maxwell - Elspet Gray
Betty Fowler - Patricia Hicks

Film adaptation
In 1949 the play was adapted into a film Edward, My Son directed by George Cukor and starring Spencer Tracy as Holt and Deborah Kerr as his wife. The film was produced by Metro-Goldwyn-Mayer British Studios, and shot at Elstree Studios and on location in London.

References

Bibliography
 Wearing, J.P. The London Stage 1940-1949: A Calendar of Productions, Performers, and Personnel.  Rowman & Littlefield, 2014.

External links
 

1947 plays
Plays set in London
British plays adapted into films